Canadian singer Shania Twain has released six studio albums, three compilation albums, three remix albums, one box set, two live albums, 45 singles, 38 music videos, six promotional singles, and made six guest appearances. Twain's repertoire has sold over 34 million albums in the United States alone, placing her as the top-selling female artist in country music. Moreover, with 48 million copies shipped, she is ranked as the 26th best-selling artist overall in the US, tying with Kenny G for the spot. She is also recognized as one of the best-selling music artists in history, selling over 100 million records worldwide and thus becoming the top-selling female artist in country music ever.

In 1992, Twain signed to Mercury Records Nashville in the United States and released her eponymous debut studio album, Shania Twain, the following year. It was a commercial failure, peaking at number 67 on Billboard Top Country Albums chart, and produced three singles, which were also commercial failures. However, the album attracted the interest of record producer Robert John "Mutt" Lange. He and Twain collaborated on her second release, The Woman in Me, which was released in 1995. The Woman in Me commenced with small sales but eventually led Twain to commercial success. It topped Top Country Albums and peaked at number five on the main-genre Billboard 200. The album was certified 12 times platinum (diamond) by the RIAA and sold over 7.6 million copies, according to Nielsen SoundScan. Furthermore, The Woman in Me led to success in the singer's native country, Canada, where it was certified double diamond by Music Canada and was once the best-selling album by a female country singer; Twain later surpassed herself. The album spawned eight singles, four of which ("Any Man of Mine", "(If You're Not in It for Love) I'm Outta Here!", "You Win My Love", and "No One Needs to Know") topped the US Hot Country Singles & Tracks.

In 1997, Twain followed with Come On Over, which topped Top Country Albums for a record 50 non-consecutive weeks and had tremendous pop crossover success. It peaked at number two on the Billboard 200 and remained in the top 10 for a total of 53 weeks, making it the longest-running top 10 album by a country artist at the time. Certified 20 times platinum (double diamond) by the RIAA and with 15.5 million copies sold, Come On Over established itself as one of the best-selling albums of all time in the US and was once the best-selling album of the Nielsen SoundScan era; it now ranks second behind Metallica's 1991 eponymous album. In Canada, it reached similar success and was certified double diamond by Music Canada. In 1998, Come On Over was released internationally, duplicating the commercial success it encountered in North America. It became one of the best-selling albums in several countries, including Australia and the United Kingdom. With a total of 40 million copies sold worldwide, Come On Over also became one of the best-selling albums worldwide. Furthermore, the album is the best-selling album by a female artist in any genre and the best-selling country album of all time. A total of 12 singles were released from the album. Three ("Love Gets Me Every Time", "You're Still the One" and "Honey, I'm Home") topped Hot Country Singles & Tracks. A total of 10 songs charted within the top 10 of the chart, marking the most top 10 appearances from one album on Hot Country Singles & Tracks. Several performed well internationally, namely "You're Still the One", "From This Moment On", "That Don't Impress Me Much", "Man! I Feel Like a Woman!", and "Don't Be Stupid (You Know I Love You)", all of which received platinum certifications by the ARIA (ARIA).

In 2002, five years following the original release of Come On Over, came the release of the double-disc album Up!. The release became Twain's first number-one album in the US, topping the Billboard 200 for five consecutive weeks. Up! sold over 5.4 million copies, yet was certified 11 times platinum (diamond) by the RIAA for being a multi-disc release with over 100 minutes in length (see RIAA certification). Nevertheless, as Twain's third diamond album, it made her the only artist to have three consecutive diamond RIAA certified albums. Like her two previous albums, Up! was also certified double diamond in Canada. Despite achieving much commercial success, Up! was unable to duplicate the tremendous outcomes of Come on Over. It produced eight singles, led by "I'm Gonna Getcha Good!", a song that became the singer's first number-one in Canada. In 2004, Twain released a Greatest Hits package that was certified quadruple platinum by the RIAA and spawned three new singles including the hit "Party for Two". Concluding a six-year hiatus, Twain released the single "Today Is Your Day" in 2011. On September 29, 2017, Twain released her fifth studio album Now. The album peaked at number one on the Billboard 200, becoming her second album to top the chart.

Albums

Studio albums

Compilation albums

Live albums

Singles

As lead artist

Promotional singles

Other charted songs

Other appearances

Notes

References

External links
 The official website of Shania Twain
 Shania Twain overview at Allmusic

Country music discographies
Discographies of Canadian artists
Pop music discographies
Discography